Norborne may refer to:

 Norborne, Missouri, United States
 Walter Norborne (died 1659), English MP
 Walter Norborne (died 1684), English MP

See also
 Norborne Berkeley (disambiguation)
 Norbourne Estates, Kentucky suburb of Louisville, Kentucky, known as Norbourne